Ancyronyx jaechi is a species of riffle beetle found in Sri Lanka.

Description
The species is typically 2.1 to 2.6 mm long. It has an elongated body with yellow-brown patterning.

References 

Elmidae
Insects of Sri Lanka
Insects described in 2012